The 23rd Landwehr Division (23. Landwehr-Division) was a unit of the Imperial German Army in World War I.

References
 23.Landwehr-Division (Chronik 1915/1918) - Der erste Weltkrieg
 Hermann Cron et al., Ruhmeshalle unserer alten Armee (Berlin, 1935)
 Hermann Cron, Geschichte des deutschen Heeres im Weltkriege 1914-1918 (Berlin, 1937)
 Günter Wegner, Stellenbesetzung der deutschen Heere 1825-1939. (Biblio Verlag, Osnabrück, 1993), Bd. 1
 Histories of Two Hundred and Fifty-One Divisions of the German Army which Participated in the War (1914-1918), compiled from records of Intelligence section of the General Staff, American Expeditionary Forces, at General Headquarters, Chaumont, France 1919 (1920)

Infantry divisions of Germany in World War I